Calohilara is a genus of flies in the family Empididae.

Names brought to synonymy
 Calohilara elegans Frey, 1952, a synonym for Hilara elegans Frey, 1952

References

External links 

 

Empidoidea genera
Empididae